La Sierra Academy (LSA) is a private, co-educational, transitional kindergarten–12th grade Christian school in Riverside, California. La Sierra Academy's mission statement states: "As a Christian K - 12 college preparatory school, we serve students from diverse backgrounds by providing the learning opportunities and skills needed to contribute to society, to prepare for life's work, and to flourish spiritually." LSA is a part of the Seventh-day Adventist education system, the world's second largest Christian school system.

History
La Sierra Academy was founded in the fall of 1922 as a secondary school. The land on which it was founded was formerly part of the 1846 Mexican land grant, Rancho La Sierra. La Sierra Academy's first school bulletin from 1922 stated that its students would "learn to render effective service." The school grew into a junior college and later into a full four year liberal arts college. This shift created a need to separate the academy into other academic levels. Thus in 1940, La Sierra College Preparatory School, now known as La Sierra University, was established.  In 1955 the school moved to its current location along Pierce Street and Golden Avenue less than a mile away from the University.

Academics
The required curriculum includes classes in the following subject areas: Religion, English, Social Studies, Mathematics, Science, Physical Education, Health, Computer Applications, Fine Arts, and Electives.

Spiritual aspects
All students take religion classes each year that they are enrolled. These classes cover topics in biblical history and Christian and denominational doctrines. Instructors in other disciplines also begin each class period with prayer or a short devotional thought, many which encourage student input. Outside the classroom there are spiritually oriented programming that relies on student involvement year-round.

Incidents
On March 4, 2020, counselor Matthew Johnson was arrested for creation, possession, and distribution of child pornography. He was accused of secretly videotaping inside a boys' restroom on campus. Three alleged victims have sued La Sierra Academy for continued employment of Johnson despite his previous alleged inappropriate conducts with children. Victims' attorney Morgan Stewart stated that La Sierra Academy has "failed in their most basic moral responsibility to protect vulnerable children from a serial sexual predator."

See also

 List of Seventh-day Adventist secondary schools
 Seventh-day Adventist education

References

External links
 

Christian schools in California
Educational institutions established in 1922
Private elementary schools in California
High schools in Riverside, California
Private middle schools in California
Adventist secondary schools in the United States
Private high schools in California
1922 establishments in California